Ceibal can refer to:

Ceibal project, the Uruguayan counterpart of the One Laptop Per Child project
Seibal (in Spanish "Ceibal"), a ruined site of the Maya civilization